Hakea smilacifolia is a shrub in the family Proteacea. It has sweetly scented flowers, stiff leathery leaves and is  endemic to an area in the Mid West, western Wheatbelt and the Goldfields-Esperance regions of Western Australia.

Description
The branchlets are moderately covered with long, soft hairs or coarse, rough long hairs. The hairs becoming short, soft, rusty coloured and matted at flowering. The grey-green leaves vary in shape, lower leaves are elliptic to egg-shaped. Leaves nearer to the flowers are broader and  taper to a point at the apex. The leaves are often  folded over and  have curving prominent veins. The inflorescence consists of 5 or 6 white or creamy-white flowers, are sweetly scented and appear  in clusters in the leaf axils.

Taxonomy and naming
Hakeas smilacifolia was first formally described by Carl Meisner in 1845 and published the description in Plantae Preissianae.  The specific epithet refers to a similarity of the leaves of this species to one in the genus Smilax.

Distribution and habitat
Grows from the northern sandplains at Three Springs ranging south to Gingin.  There is also a recorded population west of Esperance.  Grows in heath and scrubland in sand and gravel.  Requires good drainage and sunny aspect.

Conservation status
Hakea smilacifolia is classified as "not threatened" by the Western Australian Government Department of Parks and Wildlife.

References

smilacifolia
Eudicots of Western Australia